Madingley Road is a major arterial road linking central Cambridge, England with Junction 13 of the M11 motorway. It passes by West Cambridge, a major new site where some University of Cambridge departments are being relocated.

The road is designated the A1303. At the eastern end, the A1303 continues as Northampton Street, then Chesterton Lane and Chesterton Road. There is a junction with the A1134 (Queen's Road) to the south.

At the Cambridge (east) end of the road, there are a number of large detached residences. Side streets include Grange Road and Wilberforce Road.

The village of Coton is south of the western end of Madingley Road.

Buildings
The following are located on or close to Madingley Road:

 AVEVA Group plc
 British Antarctic Survey
 Cambridge American Cemetery and Memorial
 Cambridge Observatory
 Cavendish Laboratory
 Churchill College, on Storey's Way
 Computer Laboratory
 Lucy Cavendish College
 Marshall House (formerly Balliol Croft)
 Microsoft Research Cambridge
 Royal Greenwich Observatory
 Schlumberger Cambridge Research Centre
 School of Veterinary Science
 Cambridge University Athletics Track
 Whittle Laboratory

Notable residents 
The following have lived on or close to Madingley Road:

 Authors Kingsley Amis and his son Martin Amis as a child
 Author and priest A. C. Bouquet
 Inventor Clive Sinclair

Botanical 
One of the last known stands in England of rare semi-mature Plot elms, the Madingley Road elms descended from those described by botanists Elwes and Henry in 1913 and studied by R. H. Richens in 1960, was destroyed by Cambridge City Council for road-widening, between about 2007 and 2014.

See also 
 The village of Madingley, Cambridgeshire
 Conduit Head

References 

Streets in Cambridge
Transport in Cambridge
Roads in Cambridgeshire
Lucy Cavendish College, Cambridge
Churchill College, Cambridge